Eupatorium shimadai is a plant species in the family Asteraceae.

References

shimadai
Plants described in 1932